"The Man Who Told Everything" is the third single from Doves' debut studio album Lost Souls. The single was released on 30 October 2000 in the UK on 2 CDs, then released on 7" vinyl on 6 November 2000. The song charted at #33 on the UK Singles Chart. The single version is subtitled "Summer Version" and features a different mix from the album version. The live version of "Rise" on CD1 was recorded live for Australia's Triple J Radio; "The Cedar Room" and "Here It Comes" recorded live at the same sessions would later be released as B-sides to the band's "There Goes the Fear" single in the Netherlands in 2002 and the Japanese EP for "Pounding."

Track listings

Charts

References

2000 singles
2000 songs
Doves (band) songs
Heavenly Recordings singles
Songs written by Jimi Goodwin
Songs written by Andy Williams (Doves)
Songs written by Jez Williams